Lutheran Graduate School of Theology in Madagascar (SALT) is a school of Theology in Madagascar, operated by the Malagasy Lutheran Church (FLM).  It was officially inaugurated on Sunday, November 12, 1989 at Ivory Avaratra, Fianarantsoa.

The objectives of the Malagasy Lutheran Church for setting up SALT 
SALT is a successor to the former "Lutheran Theological Seminary" which existed at the same location. Its purpose is higher studies in theology.
The FLM created it to better train church workers in advanced areas of theology and leadership, and to afterward better serve the church in many working areas, at different levels (parish, district, synod, institution/department).
It is also aimed at providing the Regional Seminaries with Teachers of theology.

SALT curriculum for three years of studies 
Regular papers and final exams, in all three years.
Students in their second year are required to write a "Short Memoir" (50p to 60p in Malagasy language) or (30p to 45p in French or English) to complete the requirements to complete the "Licentiate degree in Theology".
During the third year, students have classes only in the first semester, with elective courses and a final exam. The second semester is focused on research and writing a "Memoir" (100p to 150p in Malagasy, or 75p to 100p in French or English) in completion of requirements for the "Master's degree in Theology".
Either for the "Short Memoir" or the "Memoir", students have to pass an Oral Assessment to defend their masterpieces.
The Jury members for the "Short Memoir" are SALT's lecturers only. But for the "Memoir", apart from SALT's lecturers, examiners within FLM (and from outside SALT) are invited to orally assess the students.

Recruitment of lecturers 
Theologians (women and men) with the "Doctorate in Theology" may be appointed by the FLM to teach theological subjects at SALT.
Other subjects (such as foreign languages, sociology, anthropology) can be taught by lay persons with the appropriate skills and academic degrees (Master's, Doctorate).

Recruitment of students 
Admission to SALT is through a selective and competitive process.
Candidates must take part in the national competitive tests for each new class.
The first one of each Regional Synod who gets a general average "10 / 20", or beyond that, is admitted as a "scholarship recipient student". So the number of "scholarship recipient students" depends on the number of the Church's existing Synods.
Those who get that required average, but at the lower ranks, can be received as "non-scholarship recipient students from SALT" or "self-supporting students".
Candidates must be holders of the government national "Baccalauréat" degree (on general education or in technics) and the "Baccalauréat" in Theology delivered at the 5th year of studies at the Regional Lutheran Theological Seminaries (STPL).

SALT Mission Partners 
NMS (Norwegian Missionary Society) in Norway 
ELCA (Evangelical Lutheran Church in America) 
Danmission in Denmark
ANELF (Alliance Nationale des Eglises Luthériennes de France) in France
LWF (Lutheran World Federation) in Geneva
NALC (North American Lutheran Council)

External links
FLM (Malagasy Lutheran Church)

Buildings and structures in Fianarantsoa
Lutheran seminaries